Embrujo antillano (Caribbean Charm), is a Mexican drama film directed by Juan Orol. It was released in 1947 and starring María Antonieta Pons and Blanquita Amaro.

Plot
A young girl tired of working in the cultivation of tobacco with her father in Pinar del Rio, Cuba, decides to go to Havana to try her luck, but after several setbacks ends up working in a tobacco factory. In this place, she falls in love with one of the owners of the factory, a young man newly arrived in the country after years of study abroad. But this young man was engaged to the daughter of her partner, and here begins a struggle between the two women, which ends with an unexpected ending.

Cast
 María Antonieta Pons 
 Blanquita Amaro 
 Ramón Armengod
 Kiko Mendive

Reviews
The film was part of a plan for an American film producer, Geza P. Polaty to take the Cuban rumbera María Antonieta Pons to the market of his country. The crew was bilingual, except for the musicians, including composers like Osvaldo Farrés and Julio Brito, who composed the songs of this film. The film, of dubious artistic quality, was a blockbuster. The film was also the last film collaboration between Juan Orol and his second wife and muse, Maria Antonieta Pons.

The film is also mentioned in the biopic film about Juan Orol, El fantástico mundo de Juan Orol (Sebastian del Amo, 2012).

References

External links
 
 Cinemateca Cubana: Embrujo antillano

1947 films
Mexican black-and-white films
Rumberas films
1940s Spanish-language films
Films directed by Juan Orol
Mexican drama films
1947 drama films
1940s Mexican films